The 2009 Indiana Hoosiers football team represented Indiana University Bloomington during the 2009 NCAA Division I FBS football season. The Hoosiers were led by Bill Lynch, who was in his third season as head coach. The Hoosiers played their home games at Memorial Stadium in Bloomington, Indiana. The Hoosiers finished the season 4–8 (1–7 Big Ten).

Schedule

Roster

2010 NFL draftees

References

Indiana
Indiana Hoosiers football seasons
Indiana Hoosiers football